La Espina is one of 28 parishes (administrative divisions) in Salas, a municipality within the province and autonomous community of Asturias, in northern Spain.

Villages
 Ablanedo (Ablanéu) 
 Cotariello (Cotariellu) 
 El Posadorio (Pousadoriu) 
 La Espina 
 Ovés (Ouvés)

References

Parishes in Salas